The following is a list of events affecting radio broadcasting in 2023. Events listed include radio program debuts, finales, cancellations, station launches, closures, and format changes, as well as information about controversies and deaths of radio personalities.

Notable events

January

February

March

Deaths
 January 8: 
Arnie Coro, Cuban radio host, co-founder of Radio Havana (born 1942)
Ernst Grissemann, Austrian radio host, journalist, and actor (born 1934)
 January 13: Ray Cordeiro, Hong Kong disc jockey (born 1924) 
 January 20: Jerry Blavat, American Disk Jockey (born 1940)  
 February 11: Ivan Kováč, Slovak middle-distance runner and radio sports commentator (born 1948)
 March 5: Mark Pilgrim, South African broadcaster (born 1969)

See also
 2023 in British radio

References

2023 in radio
Radio by year
Mass media timelines by year

2023